Thunder Creek is a former provincial electoral district for the Legislative Assembly of the province of Saskatchewan, Canada. This district was created before the 3rd Saskatchewan general election in 1912. The constituency was dissolved and combined with the Arm River, Morse and Lumsden districts before the 9th Saskatchewan general election in 1938.

This district was revived for the 18th Saskatchewan general election in 1975.

Members of the Legislative Assembly

Election results

|-

 
|Conservative
|Andrew Dunn Gallaugher
|align="right"|1,015
|align="right"|44.93%
|align="right"|–
|- bgcolor="white"
!align="left" colspan=3|Total
!align="right"|2,259
!align="right"|100.00%
!align="right"|

|-
 
|style="width: 130px"|Conservative
|Andrew Dunn Gallaugher
|align="right"|2,165
|align="right"|45.72%
|align="right"|+0.79

|- bgcolor="white"
!align="left" colspan=3|Total
!align="right"|4,735
!align="right"|100.00%
!align="right"|

|-

 
|Conservative
|Andrew Dunn Gallaugher
|align="right"|688
|align="right"|48.52%
|align="right"|+2.80
|- bgcolor="white"
!align="left" colspan=3|Total
!align="right"|1,418
!align="right"|100.00%
!align="right"|

|-

 
|Conservative
|John A. Stinson
|align="right"|753
|align="right"|31.73%
|align="right"|-16.79

|- bgcolor="white"
!align="left" colspan=3|Total
!align="right"|2,373
!align="right"|100.00%
!align="right"|

|-
 
|style="width: 130px"|Conservative
|Harold Alexander Lilly
|align="right"|1,892
|align="right"|61.73%
|align="right"|+30.00

|- bgcolor="white"
!align="left" colspan=3|Total
!align="right"|3,065
!align="right"|100.00%
!align="right"|

|-

 
|Conservative
|Harold Alexander Lilly
|align="right"|1,396
|align="right"|34.84%
|align="right"|-26.89
 
|Farmer-Labour
|C. A. Stuart
|align="right"|1,003
|align="right"|25.03%
|align="right"|–
|- bgcolor="white"
!align="left" colspan=3|Total
!align="right"|4,007
!align="right"|100.00%
!align="right"|

See also 
Electoral district (Canada)
List of Saskatchewan provincial electoral districts
List of Saskatchewan general elections
List of political parties in Saskatchewan
Mortlach, Saskatchewan

References 
 Saskatchewan Archives Board – Saskatchewan Election Results By Electoral Division

Former provincial electoral districts of Saskatchewan